Clarkson is a census-designated place (CDP) in Monroe County, New York, United States. The population was 4,358 at the 2010 Census. The town is surrounded by the town of the same name, and has an intersection that includes State Routes 19 and 104.

Demographics

References

Census-designated places in Monroe County, New York
Census-designated places in New York (state)